The 2014 William Hill Greyhound Derby took place during May with the final being held on 31 May 2014 at Wimbledon Stadium. The final worth a record £200,000 was won by a competition outsider called Salad Dodger.

Final result 
At Wimbledon (over 480 metres):

Distances 
, short head, 2, 1 (lengths)
The distances between the greyhounds are in finishing order and shown in lengths. One length is equal to 0.08 of one second.

Race Report
As the lids lifted it was Crokers Champ with his customary early pace that took up the running. Salad Dodger also broke well and was well positioned as Droopys Ward began to make progress with his strong finish. The British bred Salad Dodger caught the Irish leader on the run in to claim the huge prize with Droopys Ward just failing to catch Salad Dodger after overtaking Crokers Champ for second place. Trainer Bruno Berwick had recently left Coventry following its closure and this had influenced his decision when deciding whether to enter Salad Dodger for the event.

Quarter finals

Semi finals

See also 
2014 UK & Ireland Greyhound Racing Year

References

Greyhound Derby
English Greyhound Derby
Grey
English Greyhound Derby